Bergen County Christian Academy (BCCA) is a private Christian school located in Hackensack, in Bergen County, New Jersey, United States. Bergen County Christian Academy was founded in 1973 as Hackensack Christian Schools, a ministry of First Baptist Church of Hackensack. Hackensack Christian was reestablished as Bergen County Christian Academy in 2016. The Academy is a member of the American Association of Christian Schools (AACS), Garden State Association of Christian Schools (GSACS) and Metro Christian Athletic Association (MCAA). Bergen County Christian Academy also accepts international students through the Student and Exchange Visitor Program (SEVP and I-20)

As of the 2019–20 school year, the school had an enrollment of 101 students (plus 19 in PreK) and 18 classroom teachers (on an FTE basis), for a student–teacher ratio of 5.6:1. The school's student body was 37.6% (38) Hispanic, 27.7% (28) White, 13.9% (14) two or more races, 12.9% (13) Asian and 7.9% (8) Black.

Athletics
Bergen County Christian Academy offers Junior Varsity and Varsity Soccer, Basketball, and Volleyball.
Co-Ed Junior Varsity teams go from grades 5-8, Varsity Boys from grades 9-12, and Varsity Girls from grades 9-12. The JV Basketball teams go from grades 5-8 and Varsity teams 9-12.

Academics
Bergen County Christian Academy offers multiple instrumental lessons, through the BCCA Conservatory, which include private piano, guitar, drums, multiple woodwind, and vocal lessons to students who wish to learn how to play these instruments.

Some institutions that BCCA graduates have attended are Berklee College of Music (Boston), New Jersey Institute of Technology (NJIT), New York University (NYU), Liberty University, Cedarville University, and many more.

References

External links
 
 Youtube Page

1973 establishments in New Jersey
Christian educational institutions
Christian schools in New Jersey
Educational institutions established in 1973
Hackensack, New Jersey
Private elementary schools in New Jersey
Private middle schools in New Jersey
Private high schools in Bergen County, New Jersey
Schools in the Garden State Association of Christian Schools